The 2020–21 season was Associazione Calcio Monza's 39th season—and 1st in 19 years—in the Serie B, the second level of Italian football. The club participated in the Serie B, finishing third, and reached the fourth round of the Coppa Italia. In the promotion play-offs, Monza lost to Cittadella 3–2 on aggregate in the semi-finals.

Pre-season and friendlies
On 5 September 2020, Monza played a friendly against Serie A side AC Milan, at the San Siro. Silvio Berlusconi, Monza's president, and Adriano Galliani, the club's chairman, were formerly part of Milan. The two had won 29 trophies in 31 years with the Serie A club. Davide Calabria gave Milan the lead with a shot from outside the box in the 6th minute of play. In the 23rd minute, Mattia Finotto leveled the score after beating goalkeeper Antonio Donnarumma one-on-one. Three goals by Daniel Maldini, Pierre Kalulu, and Lorenzo Colombo gave Milan the 4–1 win.

Monza played three more friendlies: a 2–1 win against Lecco, won thanks to an 86th-minute goal by new signing Mirko Marić, a 1–1 draw against Vicenza, in which Finotto scored Monza's goal, and a 1–0 win against Alessandria, with new signing Christian Gytkjær scoring the lone goal of the game. As a result of the COVID-19 pandemic, all four friendlies were played behind closed doors.

Results list Monza's goal tally first.

Serie B

Overview 
Having won Group A of the 2019–20 Serie C, Monza were promoted back to the Serie B after a 19-year absence from the competition. Monza began their season in September with a 0–0 draw at home to newly relegated SPAL, with Gytkjær missing a penalty for Monza. In October two more draws ensued: another goalless draw, against Empoli, and a 1–1 draw to Pisa, with Davide Frattesi scoring Monza's first goal in the Serie B in 19 years. Monza's first defeat of the season came in the form of a 2–1 defeat at home against Chievo, where Monza's Antonino Barillà was sent off in the 43rd minute. Monza's first Serie B win in 19 years came away to Cittadella, winning 2–1 through two penalties. In November the team won their second league game in a row, beating Frosinone 2–0 at home. Following the international break, Monza drew 1–1 away to Pordenone, then won 1–0 at home to a 10-man Reggina.

In December drew Monza 1–1 to Vicenza in a match postponed due to the COVID-19 pandemic, and then lost their second game of the season away to Reggiana in a 3–0 defeat. Monza rebounded from their previous defeat, defeating Venezia 2–0 away from home, and Virtus Entella 5–0 at home in their largest season victory to date through braces by Kevin-Prince Boateng and Mario Sampirisi. The two wins were followed by a 3–2 defeat away from home to Pescara, with Monza's Filippo Scaglia being sent off in the 62nd minute. Former Pescara player Davide Bettella scored two goals for Monza. Following their defeat, Monza beat Ascoli 2–0 at home, and Cremonese 2–0 away. They then beat league leaders Salernitana 3–0 at home, with new signing Mario Balotelli scoring a goal. Monza moved up to third place before the end of 2020.

Monza started 2021 with a 0–0 draw to Lecce. After a two-week break, Monza wasted a 2–0 lead to 16th-placed Cosenza, conceding two goals to draw 2–2. Monza finished the first leg with a 1–0 away win over cross-region rivals Brescia, climbing to second place. In the second leg, Monza drew 1–1 away to SPAL, and drew by the same result at home against league-leaders Empoli in February. They then returned to victory by beating Vicenza 2–1 away from home, before Pisa interrupted their nine-game unbeaten streak, losing 2–0 at home. Monza rebounded from their defeat by beating Chievo 1–0 away, returning to second place, then drew 0–0 at home to Cittadella. In March they drew 2–2 away to Frosinone, before returning to win at home for the first time in over two months, beating Pordenone 2–0. Monza then lost 1–0 to 14th-placed Reggina away from home, beat Reggiana 2–0 at home, and lost to Venezia 4–1, also at home, through a Mattia Aramu hat-trick.

Monza began April with two 1–1 draws to the two bottom-placed teams, Virtus Entella and Pescara, and a 1–0 defeat to 17th-placed Ascoli. They then returned to victory after four games, beating Cremonese 2–1 at home. In May, fourth-placed Monza played their last four games of the regular season against Salernitana and Lecce, respectively in third and second place, Brescia and Cosenza. By winning the first two games, 3–1 and 1–0 respectively, Monza shortened the gap with their opponents and climbed to third place, on par with Lecce and two points from Salernitana in second place. They finished in third place in the regular season, after beating Cosenza 3–0 and losing to Brescia 2–0, qualifying to the promotion play-offs semi-finals.

Matches
Results list Monza's goal tally first.

League table

Serie B promotion play-offs

Overview 
Having finished the regular season in third place, Monza gained direct access to the semi-finals of the promotion play-offs. Monza played on 17 and 20 May 2021 against Cittadella, who beat Brescia in the previous round. In the first leg of the semi-finals, Cittadella won 3–0 through an Enrico Baldini hat-trick. Needing to win by at least three goals at home, Monza took the lead in the 58th minute through a Mario Balotelli goal, before Marco D'Alessandro doubled the lead 20 minutes later. The match ended 2–0, and Monza were eliminated from the play-offs.

Matches
Results list Monza's goal tally first.

Bracket

Coppa Italia 

As a Serie B side, Monza entered the Coppa Italia in the second round. The draw gave Monza a home tie on 29 September against Triestina, who Monza beat 3–0. Monza played in the third round on 27 October against Pordenone. Despite being reduced to 10 men in the 41st minute, after Edoardo Colferai received his second yellow card, Monza held on to a goalless draw, with the scoreline remaining the same after extra time. In the penalty shoot-out, Daniele Sommariva saved two penalties to help Monza advance to the next round. Monza played the fourth round on 24 November against SPAL; second-half goals by Alberto Paloschi and Enrico Brignola eliminated Monza from the competition.

Results list Monza's goal tally first.

Player details 

|}

Transfers

Summer

In

Out

Winter

In

Out

Notes

References

External links
 

A.C. Monza seasons
Monza